Wang Ziling (born 14 February 1972) is a Chinese former volleyball player who competed in the 1996 Summer Olympics.

References

1972 births
Living people
Chinese women's volleyball players
Olympic volleyball players of China
Volleyball players at the 1996 Summer Olympics
Olympic silver medalists for China
Olympic medalists in volleyball
Asian Games medalists in volleyball
Volleyball players at the 1994 Asian Games
Volleyball players at the 1998 Asian Games
Medalists at the 1996 Summer Olympics
Medalists at the 1994 Asian Games
Medalists at the 1998 Asian Games
Asian Games gold medalists for China
Asian Games silver medalists for China
Volleyball players from Fujian
Sportspeople from Zhangzhou
20th-century Chinese women